Legal frameworks around fictional pornography depicting minors vary depending on country and nature of the material involved. Laws against production, distribution and consumption of child pornography generally separate images into three categories: real, pseudo, and virtual. Pseudo-photographic child pornography is produced by digitally manipulating non-sexual images of real children to create pornographic material. Virtual child pornography depicts purely-fictional characters (for example, lolicon manga). "Fictional pornography depicting minors", as covered in this article, includes these latter two categories, whose legalities vary by jurisdiction, and often differ with each other and with the legality of real child pornography.

Some analysts have argued whether or not cartoon pornography that depicts minors is a victimless crime. Laws have been enacted to criminalize "obscene images of children, no matter how they are made", typically under the belief that such materials may incite real-world instances of child sex abuse. Currently, countries that have made it illegal to possess (as well as create and distribute) sexual images of fictional characters who are described as or appear to be under eighteen years old include New Zealand, Australia, Canada,  South Africa, South Korea, and the United Kingdom. The countries listed below exclude those that ban any form of pornography, and assume a ban on real child pornography by default.

Fictional child pornography illegal

Australia

All sexualized depictions of people under the age of 18 are illegal in Australia, and there is a "zero-tolerance" policy in place.

In December 2008, a man from Sydney was convicted of possessing child pornography after sexually explicit pictures of child characters from The Simpsons were found on his computer. The NSW Supreme Court upheld a Local Court decision that the animated Simpsons characters "depicted", and thus "could be considered", real people. Controversy arose over the perceived ban on small-breasted women in pornography after a South Australian court established that if a consenting adult in pornography were "reasonably" deemed to look under the age of consent, then they could be considered depictions of child pornography. Criteria described stated "small breasts" as one of few examples, leading to the outrage. Again, the classification law is not federal or nationwide and only applies to South Australia.

Canada

Canadian laws addressing child pornography are set out in Part V of the Canadian Criminal Code, dealing with Sexual Offences, Public Morals and Disorderly Conduct: Offences Tending to Corrupt Morals. Section 163.1 of the Code, enacted in 1993, defines child pornography to include "a visual representation, whether or not it was made by electronic or mechanical means", that "shows a person who is or is depicted as being under the age of eighteen years and is engaged in or is depicted as engaged in explicit sexual activity", or "the dominant characteristic of which is the depiction, for a sexual purpose, of a sexual organ or the anal region of a person under the age of eighteen years". The definitive Supreme Court of Canada decision, R. v. Sharpe, interprets the statute to include purely fictional material even when no real children were involved in its production.

There have been at least three major cases brought up against the possession of fictional pornography within the last two decades. In April 2010 visiting American citizen Ryan Matheson (aka Brandon X) was arrested in Ottawa for bringing erotica based on Lyrical Nanoha. By October 2011 he was charged with possession and importation of child pornography and faced a minimum of 1 year in prison. The next case occurred in 2014 where a man from Nova Scotia was sentenced to 90 days after pleading guilty of possessing mostly anime images. Roy Franklyn Newcombe, 70, pleaded guilty to the charge after a NSCAD student found a USB thumb drive with sexually explicit images and videos at a computer lab in April 2014. There was no indication the images involved local people or had been manufactured by Newcombe. Most of the 20 images were anime, although a few appeared to be of real girls between five and 13 years old. The most recent case occurred in Alberta when on February 19, 2015 the Canada Border Services Agency intercepted a parcel and arrested its recipient on March 27. Based on the box art of a sculpture being shipped to him, four charges were pressed: possession/distribution, mailing obscene matter and smuggling prohibited goods. These charges were withdrawn as part of a plea deal when the accused agreed to a peace bond.

Ecuador
The possession, storing, fabrication or distribution of child pornography or any other kind of sexually explicit pedophilic material, including fictional child pornography (drawn, written, animated, etc.), is illegal under Ecuadorian law.

South Korea
The Supreme Court of South Korea ruled in November 8, 2019 that sexually explicit anime and manga depicting minors are child pornography, overturning a previous decision by a lower court.

According to The Korea Herald, this decision was made as a result of the prosecution of a 45-year-old man, known only by his surname "Lim". Lim had previously been arrested and convicted for illegally sharing pornography for profit between May 2010 and April 2013. Though Lim was sharing adult animations depicting teenage characters, Lim was initially found guilty solely of sharing pornography for personal profit by both the first and high courts. The court found it unreasonable to convict Lim of disseminating child pornography based on the schoolgirl uniforms and young appearance of the characters featured in the animations. Lim was fined ₩5,000,000 ($4,300 USD) for this conviction. However, the South Korean Supreme Court overturned this previous ruling, declaring that these characters were underage "in the perspective of a common individual of our society".

Estonia
Fictional child pornography of any form (drawn, written etc.) is illegal in Estonia per article 178 of the Penal Code. This law does not apply to Estonian citizens who legally commit the offense abroad and as of 2021 nobody has yet been charged for fictional child pornography. Precedent exists to exclude written material with literary value ("literary work" and "pornographic work" are defined differently under law), while current law remains unclear on visual art of artistic value like classical painting or manga as no precedent exists. Real pornography with underage-looking adult actors remains technically legal.

France
Since a reform of the French penal code, introduced in 2013, producing or distributing drawings that represent a minor aged less than 15 years old is considered the same as producing real child pornography and is punishable by up to five years' imprisonment and a €75,000 fine, even if the drawings are not meant to be distributed.

Ireland
Virtual child pornography is illegal in Ireland per the Child Trafficking and Pornography Act of 1998 which includes "any visual representation". The country has strict laws when it comes to child abuse material, even if it doesn't contain any "real children".

Italy
Virtual child pornography is punished with up to a third of the sanctions for real-life child pornography. Virtual images include images, or parts of images, produced and modified with software from actual photos of minors, where the quality makes it so that fake situations are manipulated to appear realistic. Under this law, fictional child pornography is also considered illegal.

Mexico
All forms of child pornography are illegal in Mexico, including fictional drawings, with prison sentences ranging from six months to 12 years depending on the felon's age.

New Zealand
In New Zealand, the Films, Videos, and Publications Classification Act 1993 classifies a publication as "objectionable" if it "promotes or supports, or tends to promote or support, the exploitation of children, or young persons, or both, for sexual purposes". Making, distribution, import, or copying or possession of objectionable material for the purposes of distribution are offences punishable (in the case of an individual) by a fine of up to NZ$10,000 on strict liability, and ten years in prison if the offence is committed knowingly.

In December 2004, the Office of Film and Literature Classification determined that Puni Puni Poemy—which depicts nude children in sexual situations, though not usually thought of as pornographic by fans—was objectionable under the Act and therefore illegal to publish in New Zealand. A subsequent appeal failed, and the series remains banned.

In April 2013, Ronald Clark was jailed for possession of anime that depicts sex between elves, pixies, and other fantasy creatures. It was ruled as obscene and he was jailed for three months following the trial. Clark was previously convicted for indecently assaulting a teenage boy and his lawyer noted that ethical issues complicated the case.

Norway
As of 2004, the Norwegian penal act criminalizes any depictions that "sexualize" children, even if it does not actually show sexual acts with children. This could include any artificially produced material, including written text, drawn images, animation, manipulated images, an adult model with childish clothes, toys, or surroundings.

The penal act has been applied to drawn images described as "hentai-images" in Agder Court of Appeal with the following remarks:

Another judgment on possession of 300 to 400 drawings downloaded from the Internet described as Japanese lolicon hentai has the following remarks:

Poland
Since the 2008 amendment to the Polish Penal Code, simulated child pornography has been forbidden in Poland. Article 202 § 4b penalizes the production, dissemination, presentation, storage or possession of pornographic content depicting the created or processed image of a minor under the age of 18 participating in a sexual activity. The perpetrator shall be subject to a fine, the penalty of restriction of liberty or deprivation of liberty for up to 2 years.

This law faced criticism from legal experts. Maciej Wrześniewski questioned the legitimacy of this article, arguing that "it is not possible to unquestionably confirm the age of a depicted person—since such a person does not in fact exist". This opinion was shared by Maciej Szmit, who called the whole article "unfortunately worded". According to the Polish prosecution authorities, if the age of a depicted person is in question, a court may appoint anthropological experts to determine it.

From 2008 to 2016, there were 12 people found guilty under Article 202 § 4b (as a primary crime). It is unknown in how many cases, if any, the judgment concerned drawn pornography, as this law is also used for pseudo-photographic child pornography, such as when photographs of children's faces are pasted onto sexually explicit images of adults' bodies.

One of the cases where the discussed Article 202 § 4b of Polish Penal Code was used in court was the case of a painter Krzysztof Kuszej. In 2011, Kuszej was charged with committing a number of prohibited acts, including "presenting processed images of minors engaging in sexual acts with intent to sell on an online auction website". 21 pieces of artwork depicting sexual acts between children and priests were secured from the artist's studio. The artist argued in court, that his art is a social commentary on subject of Catholic Church sexual abuse cases, and his artistic measures were adequate for the problem. The expert witness in art history commissioned by the court, Dr Izabela Kowalczyk, stated that these works were art rather than pornography. According to the expert, Kuszej's images do not seduce viewers and their message against child sexual abuse is apparent. Contrary to the expert witness's opinion, the court ruled that the defendant's works did indeed include pornographic content involving minors. However, according to the court, the artist's intent was not to promote the presentation of such content, but only to showcase his position on the condemnation of child sexual abuse. The court found that the artist did not identify his work with child pornography or its dissemination. The defendant could not be proven guilty of committing the crime intentionally, and the court acquitted him of all charges.

Russia
Paragraph 1 of Article 242.1 of the Criminal Code of the Russian Federation makes it illegal to create, acquire, store, and/or move across the Russian border (including through the Internet) pornographic pictures of minors for the purpose of distribution. This law also applies to drawings depicting minors, as in January 2019 a court in Bryansk sentenced a woman to three years in prison for posting erotic drawings on her webpage.

South Africa
With the promulgation of the Films and Publications Amendment Bill in September 2003, a broad range of simulated child pornography became illegal in South Africa. For the purposes of the act, any image or description of a person "real or simulated" who is depicted or described as being under the age of 18 years and engaged in sexual conduct, broadly defined, constitutes "child pornography". Under the act, anyone is guilty of an offence punishable by up to ten years' imprisonment if he or she possesses, creates, produces, imports, exports, broadcasts, or in any way takes steps to procure or access child pornography.

Switzerland
"Pornographic documents, sound or visual recordings, depictions or other items of a similar nature or pornographic performances" showing "non-genuine sexual acts with minors" are illegal according to art. 197 of the Swiss Criminal Code and liable to a custodial sentence not exceeding three years or to a monetary penalty. Purely fictional virtual child pornography—in this case, drawings and paintings— seemed to remain legal by Swiss law. New cases however complicate the matter, as contrary to the previous case a man was found guilty and fined under this law in 2021. Though it is noteworthy that he possessed real images as well. In addition, the expert body of the Swiss Crime Prevention states that even depictions in comics and mangas would be illegal under the current law.

United Kingdom

The Coroners and Justice Act of April 2009 (c. 2) created a new offence in England, Wales, and Northern Ireland of possession of a prohibited image of a child. This act makes cartoon pornography depicting minors illegal in England, Wales, and Northern Ireland. Since Scotland has its own legal system, the Coroners and Justice Act does not apply. This act did not replace the 1978 act, extended in 1994, since that covered "pseudo-photographs"—images that appear to be photographs. In 2008 it was further extended to cover tracings and other works derived from photographs or pseudo-photographs. A prohibited cartoon image is one which involves a minor in situations which are pornographic and "grossly offensive, disgusting or otherwise of an obscene character".

Prior to this, although not explicitly in the statutes, the law was interpreted to apply to cartoon images, though only where the images are realistic and indistinguishable from photographs. The new law, however, covered images whether or not they are realistic.

History
In 2006 the government was giving close consideration to the issues and options regarding cartoon pornography, according to Vernon Coaker. On December 13, 2006 UK Home Secretary John Reid announced that the Cabinet was discussing how to ban computer-generated images of child abuse—including cartoons and graphic illustrations of abuse—after pressure from children's charities. The government published a consultation on April 1, 2007, announcing plans to create a new offence of possessing a computer-generated picture, cartoon or drawing with a penalty of three years in prison and an unlimited fine.

The children's charity NCH stated that "this is a welcome announcement which makes a clear statement that drawings or computer-generated images of child abuse are as unacceptable as a photograph". Others stated that the intended law would limit artistic expression, patrol peoples' imaginations, and that it is safer for pedophiles' fantasies "to be enacted in their computers or imaginations [rather] than in reality".

The current law was foreshadowed in May 2008, when the Government announced plans to criminalise all non-realistic sexual images depicting under-18s. These plans became part of the Coroners and Justice Act 2009, sections 62–68, and came into force on April 6, 2010. The definition of a "child" in the Act included depictions of 16- and 17-year-olds who are over the age of consent in the UK, as well as any adults where the "predominant impression conveyed" is of a person under the age of 18. The Act made it illegal to own any picture depicting under-18s participating in sexual activities, or depictions of sexual activity in the presence of someone under 18 years old. The law was condemned by a coalition of graphic artists, publishers, and MPs, who feared it would criminalise graphic novels such as Lost Girls and Watchmen.

The government claimed that publication or supply of such material could be illegal under the Obscene Publications Act, if a jury would consider it to have a tendency to "deprave and corrupt". However, the published bill made no reference to the "deprave and corrupt" test.

In October 2014, Robul Hoque was convicted of possessing up to 400 explicit manga images involving fictional children, in the UK's first prosecution of its kind. He received a 9-month suspended sentence. He was also warned in court that had he been in possession of actual child pornography, he would have been sentenced to jail for a longer term in years.

Fictional child pornography legal

Brazil
Real child porn is illegal, considered to be any records of "any situation that involves a child or adolescent in explicit, real or simulated sexual activities, or the display of the genital organs of a child or adolescent for primarily sexual purposes." The adjectives "real" and "simulated" (used in the plural by the rule in art. 241-E of the code of minors) refer to the explicit sexual activities represented, and not to the child or adolescent (if real or fictional product). In other words, what the law sanctions is the participation, real or simulated (through, for example, the use of photomontage technique), of a real child or adolescent in a scene with explicit sexual content. However, drawings and other unrealistic graphic representations of fictional children no matter how offensive including pornography of the subgenre of Japanese manga/hentai lolicon and shotacon are legal and not a criminal offense.

Belgium
In Belgium, only pornographic art that realistically depicts underage characters is illegal.

Colombia
The Supreme Court of Justice of Colombia ruled in 2018 that "artificial child pornography" is not a crime. This applies to non nude photographs, drawings, animation, and situations that do not involve actual abuse. The penal code was modified afterwards by adding the word "real" when referring to representations.

Denmark
There are no laws in Denmark which prohibit pornographic drawings of children. Results of a Danish government study done in 2012 failed to show how reading cartoons depicting child pornography will lead to actual child abuse.

Finland
Producing and distributing pornography which realistically or factually depicts a child—basically photographic images—is illegal in Finland and punishable by a fine or up to two years' imprisonment. Possession of such pornography is punishable by a fine or imprisonment for up to one year.

Realistic and factual visual depiction of a child appearing in sexual acts is defined as it having "been produced in a situation in which a child has actually been the object of sexually offensive conduct and realistic, if it resembles in a misleading manner a picture or a visual recording produced through photography or in another corresponding manner of a situation in which a child is the object of sexually offensive conduct".

Purely fantasy-based virtual child pornography—in this case, drawings and paintings—remains legal by Finnish law because it has no connection to a real abuse situation; also, such depictions may serve informational or artistic purposes which can make even reality-based images legal.

Germany
In principle, the regulations in Chapter 13 of the German Criminal Law for offenses against sexual self-determination also prevent the public advocation and the degradation of minors as sexual objects. The distribution of child pornography, defined as pornography relating to "sexual acts performed by, on or in the presence of a person under 14 years of age (child), the reproduction of a child in a state of full or partial undress in an unnaturally sexual pose, or the sexually provocative reproduction of a child's bare genitalia or bare buttocks," is criminalized with a penalty of imprisonment. However, with regards to possession, only material depicting actual or realistic acts is criminalized. For reproductions of persons over 14 but under 18 years (youth pornography), the penalty for distribution is imprisonment or a fine.

Nevertheless, due to the guaranteed freedom of art, fictional works were officially deemed legal or can be checked by a legal opinion. According to German legal information websites, acquisition and possession of fictional pornography depicting minors where it is immediately apparent that the content is purely of fictional nature, such as cartoons and comics or anime and manga, are not prosecuted against unless it is not readily distinguishable whether the depiction is computer generated or real. The Federal Government also made it clear that the criminal offense "should remain limited" to cases "in which an actual event is reproduced through video film, film or photo". On the other hand, it did not regard the sanction of the regulation as fulfilled in the case of "child pornographic novels, drawings and cartoons", because their possession did not contribute to children being abused as "actors" in pornographic recordings.

Japan

Pornographic art depicting fictional underage characters (such as lolicon, shotacon) is legal in Japan, even when realistic. The last law proposed against it was introduced on May 27, 2013 by the Liberal Democratic Party, the New Komei Party and the Japan Restoration Party that would have made possession of sexual images of individuals under 18 illegal with a fine of 1 million yen (about US$10,437) and less than a year in jail. The Japanese Democratic Party, along with several industry associations involved in anime and manga protested against the bill saying "while they appreciate that the bill protects children, it will also restrict freedom of expression". The law was ultimately passed in June 2014 after the regulation of lolicon anime/manga was removed from the bill. This new law went into full effect in 2015 banning real life child pornography.

Supporters of regulating simulated pornography in Japan claim to advocate human rights and children's rights such as the Convention on the Rights of the Child. Opponents such as the  also claim to advocate for the rights of children, pointing out the decreasing numbers in sexually motivated crimes are due to simulated materials providing an outlet to those who would otherwise seek material depicting actual children. Arguments made against a ban include manga creator and artist Ken Akamatsu who stated that "There is also no scientific evidence to prove that so-called 'harmful media' increases crime". The definitions of obscenity, specifically written in law as "arouses or stimulates the viewer's sexual desire", have also been argued as ambiguous.

Netherlands

	
On October 1, 2002, the Netherlands introduced legislation (Bulletin of Acts and Decrees 470) which deemed "virtual child pornography" illegal. The laws appear to only outlaw "Three-dimensional, realistic images representing a minor engaged in a sexually explicit conduct".

In a 2010 case, after viewing the images in question, which were created on a computer, the court opined that the virtual child pornography images did not fall under criminal law. "All images can be termed as pornographic (three dimensional) cartoons, animations, or drawings. The court concludes that it is immediately obvious to the average viewer that the event is not real and that the images are manipulated images and not realistic."

In 2013, the Supreme Court of the Netherlands rules that "a realistic depiction of a non-existent child in the sense that the depiction is indistinguishable from real" is illegal, but that when "the persons depicted are 'not real children' and that for 'the average viewer (and also children) (...) it soon becomes apparent that these are manipulated images'," such depictions are not illegal.

As of September 1, 2018, the Dutch criminal law punishes "anyone who spreads, sells, openly exhibits, manufactures, imports, transports, exports, acquires, possesses, or accesses by means of an automated system or using a communication service an image (or data carrier containing an image) depicting sexual conduct, in which someone knowingly under the age of 18, is involved (or appears to be involved)" with a prison sentence of up to 4 years or a fine in the fifth category (up to €82,000).

Gray area legality for fictional child pornography

Argentina
Possession of child pornography is illegal in Argentina with prison sentences between three and six years. Before a modification on the Penal Code was promulgated on 23 April 2018, the law did not prohibit the mere possession, but other activities such as production, financing, trading, and distribution were punishable by imprisonment ranging from 6 months to 4 years. The law is unclear though when it comes to drawings or artistic representations.

Austria
Photorealistic (lit. "close to reality") depictions are prohibited, and are treated as regular child pornography. The definition of "reality" as with other countries that cite the same reasoning is not defined.

Spain
Spain allows drawn pornography which does not resemble real children, including cartoons, manga or similar representations, as the law does not consider them to be properly 'realistic images'. The Attorney General's Office considers that only extremely realistic images should be pursued. "In order to avoid undue extensions of the concept of child pornography, the concept of 'realistic images' must be interpreted restrictively. According to the Dictionary of the Royal Spanish Academy 'realist' means that which 'tries to adjust to reality'. Therefore, 'realistic images' will be images close to the reality which they try to imitate. However, too realistic image, even painting, is strictly prohibited due to the law of European Union, this can be understood as images can not be distinguished from children in reality by normal people. Therefore having realistic simulation materials that showing child porn, such as simulation pictures or videos, will be encountered penalty.

Sweden
Any images or videos that depict children in a pornographic context are to be considered child pornography in Sweden, even if they are drawings. A "child" is defined as a “person” who is either under the age of 18 or who has not passed puberty.

These laws have been recorded in the media being put into play in Uppsala: the district court punished a man with a monetary fine and probation for possession of manga-style images. This was appealed and taken to the Court of Appeal. In court, Judge Fredrik Wersäll stated that a "person" (as in the definition of a "child") is a human being. The man possessing the illustrations, as well as his lawyer, stated that a comic character is not a person (a comic character is a comic character and nothing else) and that a person does not have cat ears, giant eyes, or a tail and that a person has a nose. Some of the pictures featured illustrations of characters with these unusual body parts. The prosecutor and an expert on child pornography argued that these body parts had no effect and that the comic characters indeed were persons. As examples of what is not a person, the child pornography expert mentioned The Simpsons and Donald Duck. The Court of Appeal upheld the former verdict, for 39 of the 51 pictures, and the monetary fine was reduced. It was immediately further appealed to the Supreme Court. While the Prosecutor General agreed with the verdict of the Court of Appeal, he still recommended that the Supreme Court hear the case, to clarify the issue, and the Supreme Court decided to do so. On June 15, 2012, the Supreme Court found him not guilty. They decided that the images were not realistic and could not be mistaken for real children, and that they therefore could not be counted as exceptions to the constitutional law of freedom of speech. One picture was still considered realistic enough to be defined as child pornography according to Swedish law. However, his possession of it was considered defensible through his occupation as a professional expert of Japanese culture, particularly manga.

United States

1973–2002

In the United States, pornography is generally protected as a form of personal expression, and thus governed by the First Amendment to the Constitution. Where pornography ceases to be protected expression is when it fails the Miller obscenity test, as the Supreme Court of the United States held in 1973 in Miller v. California. Another case, New York v. Ferber (1982), held that if pornography depicts real child abuse or a real child victim, as a result of photographing a live performance for instance, then it is not protected speech (regardless of whether the material is obscene under the test).

In 1996, U.S. Congress introduced the Child Pornography Prevention Act of 1996 (CPPA) to update the types of pornographic media featuring minors considered illegal under U.S. federal law. In 2002, the United States Supreme Court ruled in Ashcroft v. Free Speech Coalition that two provisions of the CPPA were facially invalid due to being overbroad in banning materials that are neither obscene under Miller, nor produced via the exploitation of real children as in Ferber. In doing so, the case also reaffirmed Ferber while acknowledging the state of things under Miller.

2003–2007: PROTECT Act
In response to Ashcroft v. Free Speech Coalition, Congress passed the PROTECT Act of 2003 (also dubbed the Amber Alert Law) which was signed into law on April 30, 2003, by President George W. Bush. The PROTECT Act adjusted its language to meet the parameters of the Miller, Ferber, and Ashcroft decisions. The Act was careful to separate cases of virtual pornography depicting minors into two different categories of law: Child pornography law and obscenity law. In regards to child pornography law, the Act modified the previous wording of "appears to be a minor" with "indistinguishable from that of a minor" phrasing. This definition does not apply to depictions that are drawings, cartoons, sculptures, or paintings depicting minors or adults." Furthermore, there exists an affirmative defense to a child pornography charge that applies if the depiction was of a real person and the real person was an adult (18 or over) at the time the visual depiction was created, or if the visual depiction did not involve any actual minors (see subsection "c", parts 1 and 2, of 18 U.S.C. 2252A). This affirmative defense does not apply to child pornography created via morphing, namely depictions "created, adapted, or modified to appear that an identifiable minor is engaging in sexually explicit conduct (see section (8)(c) of 18 U.S.C. 2256).

The PROTECT Act also enacted  into U.S. obscenity law:

"Section 1466A of Title 18, United States Code, makes it illegal for any person to knowingly produce, distribute, receive, or possess with intent to transfer or distribute visual representations, such as drawings, cartoons, or paintings that appear to depict minors engaged in sexually explicit conduct and are deemed obscene."

Thus, virtual and drawn pornographic depictions of minors may still be found illegal under U.S. federal obscenity law. The obscenity law further states in section C "It is not a required element of any offense under this section that the minor depicted actually exist."

Laws governing non-child pornography are guided by the Miller standard, a three-prong test used by courts to dictate obscenity according to the "average person's" point of view of the standards of the community as well as state law. The parts follow: "appeals to prurient interests", "depicts or describes, in a patently offensive way, sexual conduct" as described by law, and "taken as a whole, lack serious literary, artistic, political, or scientific value." Materials that fall within all three prongs may be declared obscene in a court of law.

By the statute's own terms, the law does not make all fictional child pornography illegal, only that found to be obscene or lacking in serious value. The mere possession of said images is not a violation of the law unless it can be proven that they were transmitted through a common carrier, such as the mail or the Internet, transported across state lines, or of an amount that showed intent to distribute. There is also an affirmative defense made for possession of no more than two images with "reasonable steps to destroy" the images or reporting and turning over the images to law enforcement.

The first major case occurred in December 2005, when Dwight Whorley was convicted in Richmond, Virginia under 18 U.S.C. 1466A for using a Virginia Employment Commission computer to receive and distribute "obscene Japanese anime cartoons that graphically depicted prepubescent female children being forced to engage in genital-genital and oral-genital intercourse with adult males". On December 18, 2008, the Fourth Circuit Court of Appeals affirmed the conviction, consisting of 20 years' imprisonment. Whorley appealed to the Supreme Court, but was denied cert.

2008–present
"18 U.S.C. § 1466A" has been met with legal challenges regarding its modifications to obscenity law. In particular, the provisions of the law that establish an alternate obscenity test to the Miller standard have been challenged. In October 2008, a 38-year-old Iowa comic collector named Christopher Handley was prosecuted for possession of explicit lolicon manga. The judge ruled that two parts of the act that were broader than the Miller standard, 1466A a(2) and b(2), were unconstitutionally overbroad as applied specifically to this case, but Handley still faced an obscenity charge. Handley was convicted in May 2009 as the result of entering a guilty plea bargain at the recommendation of his attorney, under the belief that the jury chosen to judge him would not acquit him of the obscenity charges if they were shown the images in question.

A later ruling in United States v. Dean (2011) called the overbreadth ruling into question because the Handley case failed to prove that 1466A a(2) and b(2) were substantially overbroad on their face; Dean was convicted under the sections previously deemed unconstitutional due to the fact that the overbroadth claim in Handley was an as-applied overbroadth challenge, and was therefore limited to the facts and circumstances of that case, whereas in Dean the defendant was charged under 1466A a(2) for possession of material constituting actual child pornography, which does not require a finding of obscenity, and was read to fall within the language of the relevant statute. The facts of this case precluded Dean from satisfying the substantive due process requirements to satisfy a proper facial challenge against the relevant statutes.

At the state level, some states have laws that explicitly prohibit cartoon pornography and similar depictions, while others have only vague laws on such content. In California such depictions specifically do not fall under state child pornography laws, while in Utah they are explicitly banned. However, there are legal arguments that state laws criminalizing such works are invalid in the wake of Ashcroft, and some judges have rejected these laws on constitutional grounds. Accordingly, the Illinois Supreme Court in 2003 ruled that a statute criminalizing virtual child pornography was unconstitutional per the ruling in Ashcroft. On a federal level, works depicting minors that offend contemporary community standards and are "patently offensive" while lacking "serious literary, artistic, political, or scientific value"—that is, found to be "obscene" in a court of law—continue to stand as illegal, but only if the conditions for obscenity discussed above are met: mere possession of these works continues to be legal. Legal professor Reza Banakar has since stated that "serious artistic value" is very difficult to evaluate, and that the legal task of evaluating the lack of such value cannot be executed objectively.

Due to the fact that obscenity is determined by a sitting judge or jury in reference to local standards and definitions on a state-by-state, case-by-case basis, the legality of drawn or fictitious pornography depicting minors is left in a 'gray area', much like other forms of alternative pornography. Some states pay less mind to the contents of such materials and determine obscenity based on time and place an offense may occur, while others may have strict, well-defined standards for what a community may be allowed to find appropriate. Others only may have vague laws or definitions which are only used to allow the government to prosecute recidivist offenders on both a federal and state level.

Cases
At least four cases have been brought up by the mainstream media since the 2008 Iowa ruling. In three of these cases the perpetrator either had a prior criminal record, or was also involved with real-life child pornography which contributed to the charges. The fourth case involved a person who was charged with actual child pornography for possessing fictional child pornography. This ended with a plea bargain to drop the "actual" bit in favor of possession of "Incest Comics".

The first of these cases occurred in October 2010, when a 33-year-old man from Idaho named Steven Kutzner entered into a plea agreement concerning images of child characters from the American animated television show The Simpsons engaged in sexual acts. The incident was identified, and reported to U.S. authorities by German Federal Police who were able to obtain Kutzner's IP address. This particular address contained a known file from which actual child pornography was being shared. A subsequent forensic investigation uncovered "six hundred and thirty two (632) image files, seventy (70) of which were animated images graphically depicting minors engaging in sex acts", "five hundred and twenty-four (524) pornographic image files, most of which depict what appears to be teenaged females", and "more than eight thousand files containing images of child erotica involving younger children, many of them prepubescent".

The second case occurred in November 2011, when Joseph Audette, a 30-year-old computer network administrator from Surry, Maine, was arrested after his username was linked to child pornography sites. In this instance a search inside Audette's home also uncovered "anime child pornography". A judge eventually lifted all bond restrictions placed on him as Audette was never formally charged after his arrest.

The third case is the only instance involving possession of fictional child pornography. In October 2012, after being reported by his wife, a 36-year-old man named Christian Bee in Monett, Missouri entered a plea bargain to "possession of cartoons depicting child pornography", with the U.S. attorney's office for the Western District of Missouri recommending a 3-year prison sentence without parole.
The office in conjunction with the Southwest Missouri Cyber Crimes Task Force argued that the "Incest Comics" on Bee's computer "clearly lack any literary, artistic, political, or scientific value". Christian Bee was originally indicted for possession of actual child pornography, but that charge was dropped as part of a plea deal, and was instead charged with possession of the "Incest Comics".

The fourth case occurred on May 18, 2018, when a registered sex offender from Newport News, Virginia was sentenced to over 19 years in prison for the attempted receipt of obscene images, obstruction of justice, destruction of evidence, and sex offender penalties. Elmer E. Eychaner, III (aged 46) was described as having a significant history of sexual offenses involving minors. He had most recently been convicted in 2008 for child pornography crimes in federal court. During this instance Eychaner requested a laptop to search for a better job while on federal supervision. He instead violated the terms of his supervision by using the computer to look up obscene cartoon images depicting the sexual abuse of minors.

See also 
 Artistic freedom
 Censorship
 Freedom of speech
 Pornography laws by region
 Simulated child pornography

References

Further reading 
 

Child pornography law
Lolicon